Roy Galbraith Henderson CBE (4 July 1899 – 16 March 2000) was a British baritone singer, conductor and teacher.

Born in Edinburgh and raised in Nottingham, Henderson began singing in public during the First World War, entertaining his army colleagues. After the war he enrolled at the Royal Academy of Music (RAM) in London, where he won numerous prizes. Professionally he came to public notice in 1925 deputising at short notice in the difficult and important baritone part in Frederick Delius's A Mass of Life at a London concert. He maintained a successful concert career for the next 27 years, taking part in the premieres of many works by British composers. 

Henderson appeared in opera in two seasons at Covent Garden in 1928 and 1929, and was a founding member of the company of the Glyndebourne Festival, singing there in every season from 1935 to 1939. He was also well known as a recitalist, performing classic and new songs. He made many recordings, mainly for the Decca company, although he is particularly remembered for HMV's recordings from Glyndebourne and a 1938 Columbia recording of Ralph Vaughan Williams's Serenade to Music in which Henderson and fifteen other leading British singers took part. In addition to singing he was a conductor, mostly of choral music, and made some recordings in that capacity.

From the start of his career Henderson aimed to be a teacher of singing. He took pupils from the late 1920s onwards, and was a professor at the RAM from 1940. In 1953 he retired from public performance and devoted himself to full-time teaching. Among his many pupils the best-known was Kathleen Ferrier, and others included Jennifer Vyvyan (soprano), Constance Shacklock (mezzo-soprano), Norma Procter (contralto), Thomas Round (tenor) and John Shirley-Quirk and Derek Hammond-Stroud (baritones).

Early years
Henderson was born in Edinburgh, the third child and elder son of the Rev Alexander Roy Henderson and his wife, Jean Boyd, née Galbraith. Alexander Henderson was minister of the Augustine Congregational Church between 1895 and 1902, when he moved to England to take charge of Castle Gate Congregational Church, Nottingham. Henderson attended Nottingham High School, where he received a classical education and became captain of the cricket team. 

During the First World War Henderson served in the Artists Rifles, Nottinghamshire and Derbyshire regiment. In his hut were two well-known baritones, Percy Heming and Charles Mott, the latter being particularly helpful to him. Henderson joined an army concert party entertaining the troops, and he began learning the knack of what he called "putting it over" to an audience. According to his colleague Keith Falkner, it was then that Henderson learned to sing in public, "practising what was to become a flexible and immaculate voice during late-night sentry duty". Before he returned to civilian life he auditioned for a well-known bass-baritone, Robert Radford, who recommended a career as a singer: "He told me the raw material was there, and the rest depended on myself".

After the war Henderson gained a government grant of £150 a year to study at the Royal Academy of Music (RAM). There he won thirteen awards, including the Betjemann gold medal for singing, the Worshipful Company of Musicians' medal, and the medal for the most distinguished student of the year. In addition, he led the RAM's cricket team against the Royal College of Music, captained by Falkner, who later described his opposite number as "a passionate sportsman, playing cricket (a crafty spin-bowler) and football (a tenacious goalkeeper)". While still a student Henderson made his first broadcast in August 1922, for the Marconi Company, shortly before the establishment of the BBC. 

Senior students could be appointed sub-professors − assistants to faculty members − and while serving in that capacity Henderson decided in 1923 that when he reached the age of fifty he would retire from singing and devote himself to teaching. Before the end of the 1920s he was giving private lessons in "voice production and the interpretation of song" alongside his singing career. 

On 27 March 1926 Henderson married Bertha Collin Smyth (1901–1985), a fellow student from the RAM. They had a son and two daughters.

Singing career

Concerts
In April 1925 Henderson came to public notice by stepping in at short notice to sing the baritone part in Delius's A Mass of Life at the Queen's Hall for the Royal Philharmonic Society when the intended soloist, Percy Heming, withdrew. A London newspaper reported the next day:

Singing from memory was Henderson's lifelong preference. He found it inhibiting to have to look at a score while singing. After his 1925 success in A Mass of Life he sang in all further British performances of the work − thirteen in all − between then and 1946. Six were conducted by Sir Thomas Beecham, whom Henderson admired, although finding himself instinctively more in rapport with Sir Hamilton Harty: "I felt with Harty that there was a sort of joint effort − whatever I did he responded to, and whatever he did I responded to". After a performance of the Mass of Life with Harty in 1932 Delius wrote to Henderson saying that it had been the best performance he had heard. The composer sent him a signed photograph inscribed "To the unequalled interpreter of Zarathustra". He asked for Henderson as soloist in his Sea Drift, and in 1933 Henderson sang in the premiere of Delius's Idyll at a promenade concert under Sir Henry Wood. With Beecham, Henderson performed Delius's Songs of Sunset and An Arabesque at the 1934 Leeds Festival.

Other works by British composers in which Henderson was soloist at the first performance include  Bliss's Serenade for Orchestra and Voice, under Malcolm Sargent (1929), Dyson's The Canterbury Pilgrims under the composer (1931), Vaughan Williams's Five Tudor Portraits (1935) and Dona nobis pacem (1936), both conducted by the composer, and E. J. Moeran's Nocturne (1935). He was one of the sixteen soloists chosen for the Serenade to Music (1938), which Vaughan Williams composed as a tribute to Wood for the latter's golden jubilee as a conductor. The composer wrote the music with each soloist's voice in mind, and like the other singers, Henderson is commemorated in the published score which prints each soloist's initials alongside his or her lines, in Henderson's case "Nor is not mov'd with concord of sweet sounds".

Henderson's concert repertory was wide and varied. He was closely associated with the choral works of Elgar, and sang under the composer's baton in The Dream of Gerontius in 1933. Henderson was greatly admired in Elgar's The Apostles, In Grove's Dictionary of Music and Musicians, Alan Blyth quotes a review from The Times:
 The Times called Henderson's performance of Mendelssohn's Elijah "unforgettable in its dramatic eloquence" and praised the nobility of his Jesus in  Bach's St Matthew Passion.

Opera
Henderson's professional operatic career began in 1928. He had played Ford in Falstaff in RAM student productions at the Scala Theatre in 1925 and 1926, receiving strong praise, and he made a well-received record for Vocalion of a scene from the opera, singing the parts of both Ford and Falstaff. His professional debut in opera was in the 1928 international season at Covent Garden. He sang Donner in Das Rheingold and Kothner in Die Meistersinger von Nürnberg. In the following Covent Garden season he appeared again in Das Rheingold and sang the Herald in Lohengrin, conducted respectively by Bruno Walter and Robert Heger. Also in 1929, conducted by John Barbirolli, he played Ford in Falstaff for the British National Opera Company, opposite his RAM Falstaff, Arthur Fear.

After 1929 Henderson made no further appearances at Covent Garden. In 1931 he was the baritone soloist in a concert performance of Manuel de Falla's opera Master Peter's Puppet Show, conducted by the composer. He became closely associated with the Glyndebourne Festival. In 1934 he sang Count Almaviva in Le nozze di Figaro on the opening night of the festival's inaugural season and at twelve further performances in 1934 and 1935. Thereafter he appeared at Glyndebourne every year until the outbreak of the Second World War in 1939. His other roles there were Papageno in Die Zauberflöte (16 performances, 1936−1937), Guglielmo in Così fan tutte (19 performances, 1936−1939) and Masetto in Don Giovanni (36 performances, 1936−1939). Of these, his favourite roles were Papageno and Guglielmo: "not the Count which I didn't enjoy particularly. It's an angry, jealous part and I'm much more inclined to comedy". The conductor was Fritz Busch, who was, along with Harty, the conductor Henderson most liked working with. In 1940 the Glyndebourne company went on tour with a production of The Beggar's Opera in which Henderson played Peachum and was scheduled to take over from Michael Redgrave as Macheath, but the fall of France and evacuation from Dunkirk forced the cancellation of the tour.

Song recitals
Throughout his singing career Henderson gave song recitals. While still a student he sang in his home town, Nottingham, as early as 1920 (in "a variety of songs more or less modern"). The accompanist Gerald Moore wrote that Henderson's "quiet unobtrusive manner concealed a probing mind and an imagination that made every song he sang vital":

Moore added, "Our enjoyable work together apart, I know of no colleague with a livelier humour and keener sense of fun". The music critic Alan Blyth wrote of Henderson, "Though his voice was not intrinsically very beautiful, he used it with intelligence and charm".

Conductor and teacher

Alongside his career as a singer Henderson developed what The Times described as "a sideline as a talented and highly respected choral conductor" He was conductor of the Huddersfield Glee and Madrigal Society from 1932 to 1939, and trained the Nottingham Harmonic Society, which during the inter-war years was a particularly well known choir. In 1936 he founded the Nottingham Oriana Choir and directed it until 1952. From 1942 to 1953 he conducted the Bournemouth Municipal Choir.

Henderson retired from public performance in March 1952 to concentrate on teaching, as he had long planned. By then he had been a professor at the RAM for twelve years and continued in that capacity until 1974. After retiring from the academy he continued to teach privately for many years. His pupils at the RAM and elsewhere included the sopranos Jennifer Vyvyan, Rae Woodland, Pauline Tinsley and Marie Hayward, the mezzo-sopranos Constance Shacklock and Gillian Knight, the contraltos Kathleen Ferrier and Norma Procter, the tenor Thomas Round, the baritones John Shirley-Quirk and Derek Hammond-Stroud, and the bass Hervey Alan. After Ferrier's early death, Henderson contributed a chapter on being her teacher and friend in a memorial volume edited by Neville Cardus in 1954.

Recordings
Henderson began making records in the days of acoustic recording, and in his old age it pleased him to be, as he put it, "one of the last people alive to have sung into a horn". Some of his early recordings were included in a 1999 CD set released to mark his centenary.

Decca
Henderson had a long association with the Decca record company from its early days in 1929. As a singer he made these Decca recordings:

Source: Decca.

As a conductor Henderson made three sets for Decca:

Source: Decca.

Other recordings
Henderson made studio recordings for EMI and other labels; these and recordings of him singing in live concerts and broadcasts have been issued, including:

Source: Naxos Music Library.

Last years
Until his final years Henderson continued to teach, at his house in Belsize Park, London.  He contributed reminiscences and comment to many BBC radio programmes in his retirement, including one in 1989 in which he and the two other surviving soloists discussed the origins and premiere of the Serenade to Music half a century earlier, and another in 1991 in which he and Falkner were in conversation with Richard Baker about their long careers. To celebrate his hundredth birthday a compilation of his recordings was issued on compact disc, the earliest of them dating back to 1925.

Henderson died at the Musicians' Benevolent Fund nursing home, Ivor Newton House, Bromley, south-east London, on 16 March 2000, aged 100. He was survived by his son and one daughter; his wife and a daughter predeceased him.

Notes, references and sources

Notes

References

Sources

Books

Journals

English operatic baritones
Commanders of the Order of the British Empire
Decca Records artists
Fellows of the Royal Academy of Music
British Army personnel of World War I
English centenarians
Men centenarians
1899 births
2000 deaths
People educated at Nottingham High School
Musicians from Edinburgh
People from Nottingham
Artists' Rifles soldiers
20th-century British  male opera singers